Phillip A. Stewart is a United States Air Force major general who serves as the commander of the Nineteenth Air Force. He previously served as the Deputy Chief of Staff for Strategic Employment of the Supreme Headquarters Allied Powers Europe from 2020 to 2022.

References

External links

Living people
People from Reno, Nevada
Place of birth missing (living people)
Recipients of the Defense Superior Service Medal
Recipients of the Legion of Merit
United States Air Force generals
United States Air Force personnel of the War in Afghanistan (2001–2021)
Year of birth missing (living people)